Ingo Steuer (born 1 November 1966) is a German pair skater and skating coach. With Mandy Wötzel, he is the 1998 Olympic bronze medalist, the 1997 World champion, the 1995 European champion, and a four-time German national champion. As a coach, he led Aliona Savchenko and Robin Szolkowy of Germany to multiple world and European titles.

Personal life 
Ingo Steuer was born 1 November 1966 in Karl-Marx-Stadt (Chemnitz), Bezirk Karl-Marx-Stadt, East Germany. His son, Hugo, was born in 2003.

Competitive career

Early career 
Steuer began to skate as a young child. Domestically, he represented the club SC Karl-Marx-Stadt, which was renamed SC Chemnitz after German reunification. He skated for East Germany internationally until 1990 and then the combined Germany.

Steuer took up pair skating in the early 1980s, teaming up with Manuela Landgraf. They were coached by Monika Scheibe. In 1984, Landgraf/Steuer became the first Germans to win the World Junior Championships. After they split, Steuer skated with Ines Müller for several years. Their best results were 7th places at the Europeans. Müller quit after the 1990–91 season.

Partnership with Wötzel 
Steuer was left without a partner during 1991–92 season. He trained at the same rink and under the same coach, Monika Scheibe, as Mandy Wötzel / Axel Rauschenbach. When that pair split in 1992, Scheibe hesitated to put Wötzel and Steuer together due to doubts about whether their personalities would work well together but she was persuaded after seeing their tryout. After less than a year together, Wötzel/Steuer won the silver medal at the 1993 European Championships and the 1993 World Championships. Both were accepted into the sports division of the German army, supporting athletes.

Wötzel/Steuer had a few accidents during their career. She knocked him out with her elbow while practicing the twist lift and he broke her nose while practicing another lift. During the long program at the 1994 Winter Olympics, Wötzel tripped on a rut and fell to the ice, cutting her chin. Steuer carried her off the ice. The pair was forced to withdraw from the competition and Wötzel had to have stitches. They skated at the 1994 World Championships one month later, and finished fourth. In a humorous touch, after the program, Steuer carried Wötzel off the ice just as he had at the Olympics.

Wötzel/Steuer won the 1995 European Championships and the 1997 World Championships in Lausanne, Switzerland. Steuer underwent his fifth or sixth knee surgery in mid-1997. On 8 December 1997, a passing car's side window hit Steuer's arm, partly tearing ligaments in his right shoulder. Pain radiated to his neck and face and caused headaches but he continued to skate. Wötzel/Steuer won the silver medal at the Champions Series Final, held 19–20 December 1997 in Munich, Germany. When he caught her during a triple twist in the long program, Steuer felt a sharp pain that extended to his head. They stayed off the ice for the following three weeks. Wötzel/Steuer missed the 1998 European Championships as a result but returned in time for the 1998 Winter Olympics in Nagano, Japan, where they won the bronze medal. They then retired from competition and skated in shows and professional events.

Coaching career
After his skating career ended, Steuer began working as a coach and choreographer based in Chemnitz. Skaters he has worked with include:
 Nicole Nönning / Matthias Bleyer (ended career in 2005)
 Eva-Maria Fitze / Rico Rex (switched to Monika Scheibe in December 2005)
 Aliona Savchenko / Robin Szolkowy (five-time World champions). Steuer coached them during their entire career as a pair, from 2003 to 2014.
 Tatiana Volosozhar / Stanislav Morozov (Ukraine): Steuer coached them from summer 2008 until Morozov's retirement following the 2010 Olympics.
 Rachel Kirkland / Eric Radford (Canada) in 2008. 
 Anaïs Morand / Antoine Dorsaz (Switzerland) in 2010. 
 Daria Popova / Bruno Massot (2012 French champions). Steuer coached the pair in 2011 along with Jean-Francois Ballester.
 Aliona Savchenko / Bruno Massot
 Haven Denney / Brandon Frazier (United States) 2015–2016

Steuer said he would leave Germany if the Interior Ministry and Deutsche Eislauf-Union did not resolve his status. On 21 July 2014, the DOSB Stasi Commission announced that it would allow Steuer to work for the DEU and receive public funds.

Stasi activities and legal battles
In the 1980s, Ingo Steuer was an informant for the Stasi, the East German secret police. His activities included circulating information on his countrymen. Because of this, he has been a controversial figure in Germany. Prior to the 2006 Winter Olympics, an investigation by the National Olympic Committee determined that his involvement was so severe as to exclude him from the national team. The matter eventually went to court, where a judge ruled in Steuer's favor. At the 2006 Turin games, however, he was forbidden to wear the German team clothes. Savchenko/Szolkowy were encouraged to find a different coach, and Steuer was denied accreditation at several events. Savchenko/Szolkowy eventually went to court to appeal against this decision, and the judge ruled in their favor. At the 2010 Vancouver games, he was allowed to wear German team clothes and associate with the team.

In June 2010, the Frankfurt Landgericht rejected Steuer's lawsuit against the Bundeswehr, however, in March 2011, the Brandenburg Oberlandesgericht ruled in his favor; the Bundeswehr may appeal to the Federal Court of Justice of Germany.

Programs 
(with Wötzel)

Results 
GP: Champions Series (Grand Prix)

With Mandy Wötzel

With Ines Müller

With Manuela Landgraf

References

External links

 ARI: Ingo Steuer

1966 births
Living people
Sportspeople from Chemnitz
German male pair skaters
German figure skating coaches
Figure skaters at the 1994 Winter Olympics
Figure skaters at the 1998 Winter Olympics
Olympic figure skaters of Germany
Olympic bronze medalists for Germany
People of the Stasi
Olympic medalists in figure skating
World Figure Skating Championships medalists
European Figure Skating Championships medalists
World Junior Figure Skating Championships medalists
Medalists at the 1998 Winter Olympics